Margaretha Cornelia Galliard (25 November 1926 – October 2019) was a Dutch swimmer who won a bronze medal in the 100 m backstroke at the 1950 European Aquatics Championships. She finished eighth in the same event at the 1948 Summer Olympics. 

She wins the 100 m backstroke at the Great Prize of the town of Paris in September 1950.

After marriage, she changed her last name from Galliard to van Leersum.

Galliard died in October 2019 at the age of 92.

References

External links
Photograph
  

1926 births
2019 deaths
Dutch female backstroke swimmers
Swimmers at the 1948 Summer Olympics
Olympic swimmers of the Netherlands
European Aquatics Championships medalists in swimming
Swimmers from Amsterdam
20th-century Dutch women